Priya Sarukkai Chabria is an Indian poet and novelist writing in English. She is the author of ″Not Springtime Yet″ (HarperCollins, India) and ″Andal: The Autobiography of a Goddess″ (Zubaan Books, India), and editor of poetry at Sangam.

Life and career
Chabria, with poet Ravi Shankar, translated the songs of 8th century Tamil poet Aandaal in her book Andal: The Autobiography of A Goddess. The book won the 2017 Muse India translation award at the Hyderabad Literary Festival.

Books

Poetry 
 
Dialogue and Other Poems, Sahitya Akademi, 2005

Novels

Translations

References

External links
 Excerpts in Scroll.in
 Poet of the Month -The Missing Slate
 Priya Sarukkai Chabria -Lyrikline
 https://www.hindustantimes.com/books/interview-priya-sarukkai-chabria-author-sing-of-life-101624015347370.html

Living people
21st-century Indian poets
21st-century Indian novelists
Year of birth missing (living people)